Labohan Dagang–Nilai Route, also known as Nilai–KLIA Highway, Federal Route 32 (formerly Selangor state route B20 or Negeri Sembilan state route N20), is a major highway in the Multimedia Super Corridor area in Selangor and Negeri Sembilan states, Malaysia. The 26.0 km (16.2 mi) federal highway connects Tanjung Dua Belas, Selangor in the west to Nilai, Negeri Sembilan in the east.

The Kilometre Zero of the Federal Route 32 starts from Nilai, Negeri Sembilan.

In 2010, the highway was gazetted as the federal roads by JKR as Federal Route 32.

At most sections, the Nilai–KLIA Highway was built under the JKR R5 road standard as a dual-carriageway highway with partial access control, with a speed limit of 90 km/h.

There are no overlaps, alternate routes, or sections with motorcycle lanes.

List of interchanges

References

Highways in Malaysia
Malaysian Federal Roads